Karmakar is a Bengali Hindu caste spread throughout West Bengal, Assam and Bangladesh. The Karmakars are traditionally blacksmiths by trade.They are one of the fourteen castes belonging to 'Nabasakh' group. They are recognized as Other Backward Class and also Forward Caste (General) by the Government of West Bengal.

History 
The Karmakars used to be blacksmiths by profession. Over time, the Karmakars have produced engineering masterpieces. In 1637, Janardan Karmakar (Blacksmith) of Sylhet built the great gun of Murshidabad, the Jahan Kosha Cannon 'Destroyer of the World', which is 18' in length and weighs around 7 tons. Another grand cannon named Dal Madal Kaman was built by Jagannath Karmakar in 1565 for the kingdom of Mallabhum.In the late 18th century, Panchanan Karmakar pioneered the Bengali printing industry by inventing a movable type punch marked Bengali scripts.

Notables 

 Radhu Karmakar (1919-1993), cinematographer and film director
 Prokash Karmakar (1933-2014), artist
 Romuald Karmakar (b. 1965), French & German film director
 Joydeep Karmakar (b. 1979), sports shooter
 Prasanta Karmakar (b. 1980), swimmer
 Dipa Karmakar (b. 1993), gymnast
 Panchanan Karmakar (d. 1804),  inventor of the Bangla Font
 Tamalika Karmakar (b. 1970), actress and national award winner
 Kalidas Karmakar (b. 1946), noted artist and Ekushey Padak laureate

See also 
 Vishwakarma

References

Bibliography
 

Bengali Hindu castes
Indian castes
Blacksmith castes